USS Thompson may refer to:

 , named for Richard Wigginton Thompson and served in the 1920s; currently an exposed shipwreck in San Francisco Bay.
 , named for Robert Means Thompson and served during World War II and the Korean War

United States Navy ship names